Friesville is an unincorporated community and census-designated place (CDP) in Blair County, Pennsylvania, United States. It was first listed as a CDP prior to the 2020 census.

The CDP is in southern Blair County, in the eastern part of Greenfield Township. It is bordered to the east by Claysburg. It is on the south side of South Poplar Run, a stream which originates to the west on the north side of Blue Knob along the Allegheny Front and flows east to join Beaverdam Creek and form the Frankstown Branch Juniata River in Claysburg.

Demographics

References 

Census-designated places in Blair County, Pennsylvania
Census-designated places in Pennsylvania